Apache HiveMind is an inversion of control (IOC) software project of the Apache Software Foundation written in Java. It takes the form of a services and configuration microkernel.

In HiveMind, a service is an implementation of a Java interface. Unlike other service-oriented architectures (SOAs), HiveMind is explicit about combining Java code within a single JVM.

The HiveMind project, formerly a top-level Apache project, was retired 22 April 2009, ending its life in the Apache Attic repository.  Its successor is considered to be Tapestry IOC, a Guice-like IoC container for Java EE model–view–controller web applications. (Tapestry's requirement for IoC was the reason HiveMind was conceived in the first place.)

See also
 Spring Framework

References

External links
HiveMind home page
HiveMind Utilities
HiveMind Wiki
 HiveMind Blog
HiveMind Hello World
 Spring HiveMind integration

Java platform
HiveMind